Pedro Luís Carmo Neto de Paz (born 20 December 1994) is a Portuguese former footballer who played as a forward.

Club career
Born in Moncarapacho, Olhão, Algarve, Paz joined local S.C. Olhanense's youth system in summer 2008, aged 13. He made his professional debut with the club on 9 January 2013, appearing against Moreirense F.C. in that season's League Cup. Four days later, again as a substitute, he first played in the Primeira Liga, featuring ten minutes in a 0–2 home loss to Sporting CP.

References

External links

1994 births
Living people
People from Olhão
Sportspeople from Faro District
Portuguese footballers
Association football forwards
Primeira Liga players
S.C. Olhanense players